KPYK (1570 AM) is an adult standards radio station licensed to and serving the area around Terrell, Texas. The station is owned by Mohnkern Electronics.

History
The station began in 1949 as KTER (callsign to have stood for its previous owner Terrell Tribune); the original format of the station is unknown. The station was only allowed to operate during the daytime hours. KTER was located at the American National Bank building on Moore Avenue in Terrell.

In 1992, KTER switched to its current callsign and format.

External links
1570 KPYK Online

 DFW Radio/TV History

Radio stations established in 1949
PYK
1949 establishments in Texas